Jaap van de Griend (24 January 1904 – 27 November 1970) was a Dutch footballer. He played in five matches for the Netherlands national football team in 1928 and 1929.

References

External links
 

1904 births
1970 deaths
Dutch footballers
Netherlands international footballers
People from Vlaardingen
Footballers from South Holland
Hermes DVS players
Association football forwards